ESPNU College Basketball is a broadcast of NCAA Division I college basketball on ESPNU.

Current play-by-play announcers

Jay Alter
Dave Armstrong
Jordan Bernfield
Allen Bestwick
Brock Bowling
Mike Couzens
Mike Crispino
Ted Emrich
Sam Farber
Dave Feldman
Lowell Galindo
Tom Hart
Mitch Holthus
Derek Jones
Chuckie Kempf
Dave LaMont
Kanoa Leahey
Robert Lee
Clay Matvick
Jon Meterparel
Mike Morgan
Beth Mowins
Mark Neely
Pat O'Keefe
Alex Perlman
Roy Philpott
Bob Picozzi
Steve Quis
Eric Rothman
David Saltzman
Matt Schick
Matt Schumacker
Anish Shroff
Paul Sunderland

Current analysts

Mark Adams
Cory Alexander
Paul Biancardi
Lance Blanks
Adrian Branch
Ben Braun
Dalen Cuff
Dan Dakich
Brad Daugherty
Dan Dickau
Alex Faust
Dino Gaudio
Reid Gettys
Sean Harrington
Malcolm Huckaby
Sydney Johnson
Rob Kennedy
Kevin Lehman
Bryndon Manzer
King McClure
Tim McCormick
Myron Medcalf
David Padgett
Chris Piper
Noah Savage
Richie Schueler
Chris Spatola
Brooke Weisbrod
Tim Welsh
Julianne Viani

Former play-by-play announcers

Note: not including announcers currently calling games on ESPN, ESPN2, CBS Sports, ACC Network, Fox Sports or SEC Network.

Jim Barbar
John Brickley
Carter Blackburn
Eric Collins
Joe Davis
Todd Harris
Justin Kutcher
Dan McLaughlin
Rob Stone

Former analysts

Note: not including announcers currently calling games on ESPN, ESPN2, ACC Network, Fox Sports or SEC Network.

Matt Doherty
Darrin Horn
Stephen Howard
David Kaplan
Mike Kelley
Kara Lawson
Tim O'Toole
Mac McCausland
Craig Robinson
Miles Simon
Dickey Simpkins
Bob Valvano
Bob Wenzel
Dereck Whittenburg

References

2000s American television series
ESPNU original programming
American sports television series